The South Australian Open was a golf tournament on the PGA Tour of Australasia and the Nationwide Tour.

History 
The event started in 1933 as the South Australian Close Championship. In 1950 it was renamed the South Australian Open, although it was only in 1952 that it was opened up to players from outside the state.

In the late 1960s, there was no sponsor for the tournament. Therefore "only local club professionals competed." In 1975 there was a similar problem. The South Australian Brewing Company did not renew its sponsorship. Due to economic trouble in the country no other companies were willing to sponsor the event. The event did not take place that year.

The event was retitled the Jacob's Creek Open Championship from 2002 to 2007, sponsored by the Jacob's Creek wine brand, and was co-sanctioned during that period by the United States-based Nationwide Tour. It was played annually in Adelaide, South Australia. In 2007, the last time the tournament was held, it was one of three tournaments on the Nationwide Tour held outside the United States. After Jacob's Creek withdrew their support following the 2007 edition, the search for a new sponsor proved fruitless and the tournament was cancelled.

Winners

Notes

References

External links
Official website
Coverage on the PGA Tour's official site

Former Korn Ferry Tour events
Former PGA Tour of Australasia events
Golf tournaments in Australia
Golf in South Australia
Sport in Adelaide
Recurring sporting events established in 1960
Recurring sporting events disestablished in 2007
1960 establishments in Australia
2007 disestablishments in Australia